Max Reger was a German composer of the late-Romantic period.  His works are initially listed by Opus number (Op.), followed by works without Op. number (WoO). Other features shown are translation of titles, key, scoring, year of composition, genre, information about texts and their authors, a link to the Max-Reger-Institute, which provides detailed information about times of composition, performance and publishing, and a link to the free score when available.

History 

Reger was a German composer, born in Brand in 1873. He studied music theory in Sondershausen, then piano and theory, in Wiesbaden. The first compositions to which he assigned opus numbers were chamber music and Lieder. A pianist himself, he composed works for both piano and organ.

Reger returned to his parental home in 1898, where he composed his first work for choir and orchestra,  (Hymn to singing), Op. 21. He moved to Munich in 1901. In 1907 he was appointed musical director at the Leipzig University and professor at the Royal Conservatory in Leipzig.

In 1911 Reger was appointed Hofkapellmeister (music director) at the court of Duke Georg II of Saxe-Meiningen, retaining his master class at the Leipzig conservatory. In 1913 he composed four tone poems on paintings by Arnold Böcklin (Vier Tondichtungen nach A. Böcklin), including Die Toteninsel (Isle of the Dead), as his Op. 128. He gave up the court position in 1914 for health reasons. In response to World War I, he thought in 1914 already to compose a choral work to commemorate the fallen of the war. He began to set the Latin Requiem but abandoned the work as a fragment. In 1915 he moved to Jena, still teaching in Leipzig. He composed in Jena the Hebbel Requiem for soloist, choir and orchestra. Reger died in Leipzig on 11 May 1916.

Reger assigned opus numbers to major works himself. In his compositions for solo voices and for choirs, he set poems by notable lyricists, including contemporaries, such as Gabriele D'Annunzio, Otto Julius Bierbaum, Joseph von Eichendorff, Friedrich Hebbel, Detlev von Liliencron and Friedrich Rückert.

Table of compositions 

Reger's works with an opus number are listed first, then works designated as WoO (work without opus number). Details to compositions follow, such as song titles and names of poets for a collection of songs. The scoring is given if it cannot be recognized from the title or the genre: for example songs (Lieder, Gesänge) are normally for voice and piano, in a sonata the named solo instrument is usually accompanied by piano, and choral works are for four-part choir a cappella, unless otherwise noted.

When the opus number provides a link, it leads to more details about a work, such as the titles, markings and keys of its parts. The last column provides two link for reference, when available: one to the detailed information on the piece by the Max-Reger-Institute (in German), which appears as "MR" and the number on the website, the other to a free score (sc).

sc

Other works 
 Castra vetera, incidental music (1889-1890)
 Heroide, symphonic movement for orchestra, D minor (1889)
 Symphonic movement for orchestra, D minor (1890)
 Grande Valse de Concert for piano, "Op. 378" (1891)
 Six chorale preludes for organ (1893–1908)

 "O Traurigkeit"
 "Komm, süßer Tod"
 "Christ ist erstanden"
 "O Haupt voll Blut und Wunden"
 "Es kommt ein Schiff, geladen"
 "Wie schön leucht't uns der Morgenstern"

 Violin parts for six sonatinas, Op. 36 by Clementi (before 1895)
 Etude Brillante for piano, C minor (1896)
 Three Album Leafs for piano (1898/1899)
 Miniature Gavotte (s.a.)
 Allegretto grazioso
 Andante
 Introduction and Passacaglia for organ, D minor (1899)
 Prelude for organ, C minor (1900)
 Three sacred songs for mezzo / baritone and organ (1900/1903)
 Variations and Fugue on "Heil unserm König" for organ, C major (1901)
 Fünf Spezialstudien (Bearbeitungen Chopin'scher Werke) (1898–1899) MR203
 Four pieces for piano (1901/1906)
 Romanze, D major (1906)
 Improvisation, E minor (1901)
 Nachtstück (1903)
 Perpetuum mobile, C major (1902)
 Prelude and Fugue for organ, D minor, (1902)
 Romanze for harmonium, A minor (1904)
 Two pieces for piano (1906)
 Caprice, F-sharp minor
 Prelude and fugue for organ, G-sharp minor (1906)
 Vater unser for 12-part choir (1909) (completed by Hasse)
 An Zeppelin for 4-part men's or children's choir (1909)
 Twenty Responsories for choir (1911)
 Prelude and fugue for organ, F-sharp minor (1912)
 Marsch der Stiftsdamen for piano (1914)

Details of sets of compositions with Opus number 

 Drei Orgelstücke (Three organ pieces), Op. 7 (1892)
 Prelude and Fugue, C major
 Fantasy on 'Te Deum laudamus', A minor
 Fugue, D minor

 Fünf Lieder (Five songs), Op. 8 (1892)

 "Waldlied" (Uhland)
 "Tränen im Auge" (v. Wildenbruch)
 "Der Kornblumenstrauss" (v. Wildenbruch)
 "Scherz" (v. Chamisso)
 "Bauernregel" (Uhland)

 Twelve Waltz-Caprices for 4-hand Piano, Op. 9 (1892)

 Allegro, A major
 Presto, D major
 Andante (con passione), F-sharp minor
 Lento impetuoso, F-sharp major
 Allegro moderato (quasi andantino), D major
 Prestissimo, A major
 Moderato, C-sharp minor
 Allegro non tanto, A-flat major
 Andantino, E-flat major
 Vivace, B-flat minor
 Allegro scherzando, A-flat major
 Allegro impetuoso, D-flat major

 Zwanzig Deutsche Tänze (Twenty German Dances) for 4-hand piano, Op. 10 (1892) (also in orchestral arrangement for small orchestra by L. Artok)

 Allegretto, D major
 G minor
 Innocente, A major
 D minor
 Con anima ed scherzando, E major
 Allegro, C-sharp minor
 Cantabile, A-flat major
 Appassionato, F minor
 Allegretto, B-flat major
 Grazioso andantino, D major
 Impetuoso, E major
 Allegretto, A major
 Andantino ma non troppo, B minor
 Innocente, F major
 Scherzando, G minor
 Appassionato (non allegro), F minor
 Andantino, A-flat major
 Presto, C-sharp minor
 Giocoso, B major
 Con bravoura, E major

 Seven Waltzes for piano, Op. 11 (1893)

 Allegro ma non troppo, A major (also in arrangement for violin and piano by S. Dushkin)
 Semplice, C-sharp minor
 Moderato, D major
 Grazioso, A-flat major
 Commodo, E major
 Melancolique (Lento), F-sharp minor
 Allegro vivace, A major

 Five songs (in the style of Franz Schubert), Op. 12 (1893)

 "Friedhofgesang" (Kleinschmidt)
 "Das arme Vögelein" (v. Gilm)
 "Wenn ich's nur wüsst" (Ehlen)
 "Gruß" (Michaeli)
 "Um dich" (Kurz)

 Lose Blätter for piano, Op. 13 (1894)

 Petite Romance (Andante), F minor
 Valsette (Allegretto grazioso), A-flat major
 Scherzoso (Vivace), B-flat major
 Moment Musical (Andantino), A-flat major
 Petite Caprice (Allegretto), B flat minor
 Prélude et Fugue (Andantino (semplice) – Allegretto), F major
 Sarabande (Grave), D minor
 (Largo), B minor
 Danse des Paysans (Commodo), A major
 Chant sans Paroles, E major
 Appassionato (Vivace), C-sharp minor
 Choral (Andante), D major
 Marcia Funèbre, C minor (also in orchestral arrangement by Lothar Windsperger)
 À la Hongroise (Allegro), F minor

 Five duets for soprano, alto and piano, Op. 14 (1894)

 "Nachts" (Eichendorff)
 "Abendlied" (Goethe)
 "Sommernacht" (Saul)
 "Gäb's ein einzig Brünnelein" (from Tuscany)
 "O frage nicht" (Nawrocki)

 Ten songs for medium voice and piano, Op. 15 (1894)
 "Glück" (Rohrscheidt)
 "Das Blatt im Buche" (Grün)
 "Nelken" (Storm)
 "Traum" (Eichendorff)
 "Das Mädchen spricht" (Prutz)
 "Scheiden" (Saul)
 "Der Schelm" (R.)
 "Leichtsinniger Rat" (Saul)
 "Verlassen hab' ich mein Lieb" (Engel)
 "Trost" (Falke)

 Suite for organ No. 1, E minor, Op. 16 (1894–1895) (also in 4-hand piano arrangement by Reger)
 Introduction (Grave) and Fugue (Allegro ma non tanto)
 Adagio assai
 Intermezzo (Un poco Allegro, ma non troppo) and Trio (Andantino)
 Passacaglia (Andante)

 Aus der Jugendzeit for piano, Op. 17 (1895)

 Frohsinn (Allegretto), A major
 Hasche mich! (Grazioso), C major
 Ein Spielchen! (Andantino), F major
 Das tote Vöglein (Andante espressivo), E minor
 Über Stock und Stein (Presto), D minor
 Was die Grossmutter erzählt (Andante espressivo), G major
 Ein Tänzchen (Allegro), G minor
 Bange Frage (Andante), A minor
 Weihnachtstraum (Andantino), A major (Fantasy on Silent Night)
 Großes Fest (Allegro à la marcia), B flat major
 Abendgesang (Andante con espressione), D major
 Fast zu keck! (Allegro vivace), F major
 Frühlingslust (Vivace), C major
 Kleiner Trotzkopf (Vivace), E minor
 Reigen (Allegretto grazioso), G major
 Fast zu ernst! (Fughette – Andante con espressione), G minor
 A la Gigue (Presto assai), E minor
 Nordischer Tanz (Allegretto), D major
 Erster Streit (Agitato), D minor
 Versöhnung (Cantabile), A major

 Eight improvisations for piano, Op. 18 (1896)

 Allegretto con grazia, E major
 Andantino, B minor
 Caprice (Allegro vivace), G minor
 Andante sepmlice, D major
 Moderato, ma marcato, C minor
 Allegretto con grazia, C-sharp minor
 Vivace assai, F major
 Etude brillante (Allegro con brio), C minor

 Two sacred songs for medium voice and organ, Op. 19 (1898)
 "Passionslied"
 "Doch du ließest ihn im Grabe nicht!"

 Five Humoresques for piano, Op. 20 (1898)

 Allegretto grazioso, D major
 Presto – Andante (con grandezza), B minor
 Andantino grazioso, A major
 Prestissimo assai, C major
 Vivace assai, G minor

 Six Waltzes for 4-hand piano, Op. 22 (1898)

 Allegro, E major
 Più vivace, A major
 Allegretto, B major
 Moderato (quasi Andantino), C-sharp minor
 Vivace, B major
 Allegro vivace, E major

 Four songs, Op. 23 (1898)
 "Das kleinste Lied" (Hamerling)
 "Pythia" (Ritter)
 "Das sterbende Kind" (Geibel)
 "Vom Küssen!" (Ritter)

 Six pieces for piano, Op. 24 (1898)

 Valse-Impromptu (Grazioso) E major
 Menuett (Allegretto grazioso) B minor (reworked for orchestra and salon orchestra by Ernst Schmidt-Köthen)
 Rêverie fantastique (Quasi improvisato) F-sharp minor
 Un moment musical (Andantino) C major
 Chant de la nuit (Moderato) E major
 Rhapsodie (in the style of J. Brahms) (Agitato) E minor

 Aquarellen for piano, Op. 25 (1897–1898)

 Canzonetta (Allegretto con espressione) A minor
 Humoreske (Allegro molto e con leggierezza) G major
 Impromptu (Poco agitato) E minor
 Nordische Ballade (Pesante) C minor
 Mazurka (Allegretto grazioso) E-flat major

 Seven fantasy pieces for piano, Op. 26 (1898)

 Elegie (Andante sostenuto con espressione) E minor (also in orchestral arrangement)
 Scherzo (Allegro grazioso) E major
 Barcarole (Andantino) F major
 Humoreske (Vivace (ma non troppo)) C minor
 Resignation (Andante espressivo) A major (composed 3 April 1898, the anniversary of Brahms's death, using the main theme from the slow movement of his Symphony No. 4) (reworked for organ by Richard Lange)
 Impromptu (Presto agitato) B minor
 Capriccio (Vivace assai) C minor

 Fantasia and Fugue for organ, C minor, Op. 29 (1898) (reworked for Piano 4-hand by Richard Lange)

 Six Poems by Anna Ritter for medium voice, Op. 31 (1898)

 "Allein"
 "Ich glaub', lieber Schatz"
 "Unbegehrt"
 "Und hab' so große Sehnsucht doch"
 "Mein Traum"
 "Schlimme Geschichte"

 Seven character pieces for piano, Op. 32 (1899)

 Improvisation (Agitato ed appassionato) C-sharp minor
 Capriccio (A study) (Vivace assai) B minor
 Burleske (Vivo) C major
 Intermezzo (Agitato ed apassionato (Vivace, ma non troppo)) F-sharp minor
 Intermezzo (Andante) C major
 Humoreske (Prestissimo assai) G minor
 Impromptu (Con passione e vivace) B minor

 Five pittoresque pieces for 4-hand piano, Op. 34 (1899)

 Allegretto con moto B minor
 Prestissimo A minor
 Vivace assai G minor
 Andantino (Con moto) A minor
 Con moto (Vivace) D minor

 Nine Bunte Blätter for piano, Op. 36 (1899)

 Humoreske (Vivace assai) G minor
 Albumblatt (Andantino) F major
 Capriccietto (Vivace assai) E minor
 Reigen (Allegretto grazioso) D major
 Gigue (Vivace assai) A minor
 Elegie (Andantino sostenuto (ma non troppo)) E minor
 Valse-Impromptu (Con moto) D minor
 Capriccio (A study) (Vivace assai) C minor
 Rêverie (Andante con espressione) F major

 Five songs, Op. 37 (1899)

 "Helle Nacht" (Verlaine)
 "Volkslied" (Ritter)
 "Glückes genug" (Liliencron)
 "Frauenhaar" (Bierbaum)
 "Nächtliche Pfade" (Stieler)

 Seven songs for men's chorus, Op. 38 (1899)

 "Ausfahrt" (Scheffel)
 "Frühlingsruf" (Kleber)
 "Über die Berge!" (Ernst)
 "Wie ist doch die Erde so schön!" (Reinick)
 "Frohsinn" (after v. Klump)
 "Abendreihn" (Müller)
 "Hell ins Fenster" (Groth)

 Three songs for 6-part (SAATBB) choir, Op. 39 (1899)
 "Schweigen" (Falke)
 "Abendlied" (Plinke)
 "Frühlingsblick" (Lenau)

 Four violin solo sonatas, Op. 42 (1900)
 D minor
 A major
 B minor
 G minor

 Eight songs, Op. 43 (1900)

 "Zwischen zwei Nächten" (Falke)
 "Müde" (Falke)
 "Meinem Kinde" (Falke)
 "Abschied" (Wiener)
 "Wiegenlied" (Dehmel) (also in orchestral arrangement)
 "Die Betrogene spricht" (Ritter)
 "Mein Herz" (Wiener)
 "Sag es nicht" (Wiener)

 Ten little pieces for piano, Op. 44 (1900)

 Albumblatt (Mit Ausdruck, nicht zu langsam) B minor
 Burletta (Sehr lebhaft, mit Humor) G minor
 Es war einmal (Mässig langsam und ausdrucksvoll) E minor
 Capriccio (Sehr rasch) A minor
 Moment musical (Anmutig, etwas lebhaft) C-sharp minor
 Scherzo (Sehr schnell) D major
 Humoreske (Lebhaft) B minor
 Fughette (Mässig langsam) A minor
 Gigue (So schnell als möglich) D minor
 Capriccio (Sehr schnell; mit Humor) C major

 Six intermezzi for piano, Op. 45 (1900)

 (Sehr aufgeregt und schnell) D minor
 (Äußerst lebhaft, anmutig) D-flat major
 (Langsam, mit leidenschaftlichem, durchaus phantastischem Ausdruck) E-flat minor
 (So schnell als möglich, mit Humor) C major
 (Mit großer Leidenschaft und Energie) G minor
 (So schnell als nur irgend möglich) E minor

 Six organ trios, Op. 47 (1900)

 Canon (Andante) E major
 Gigue (Vivacissimo) D minor
 Canzonetta (Andantino) A minor
 Scherzo (Vivacissimo) A major
 Siciliano (Andantino) E minor
 Fugue (Vivace) C minor

 Seven songs for medium voice, Op. 48 (1900)

 "Hütet euch" (Geibel)
 "Leise Lieder" (Morgenstern)
 "Im Arm der Liebe" (Hartleben)
 "Ach, Liebster, in Gedanken" (Stona)
 "Junge Ehe" (Ubell) (on a theme from Wagner's Tristan und Isolde)
 "Am Dorfsee" (Wiener)
 "Unvergessen" (Frey)

 Two clarinet sonatas, Op. 49 (1900)
 A-flat major
 F-sharp minor

 Two romances for violin and small orchestra, Op. 50 (1900)
 (Andante sostenuto) G major
 (Larghetto) D major

 Twelve songs, Op. 51 (1900)

 "Der Mond glüht" (Diderich)
 "Mägdleins Frage" (Dorr-Ljubljaschtschi)
 "Träume, träume, du mein süßes Leben!" (Dehmel)
 "Geheimnis" (Evers)
 "Mädchenlied" (Morgenstern)
 "Schmied Schmerz" (Bierbaum)
 "Nachtgang" (Bierbaum)
 "Gleich einer versunkenen Melodie" (Morgenstern)
 "Frühlingsregen" (Morgenstern)
 "Verlorne Liebe" (Galli)
 "Frühlingsmorgen" (Müller)
 "Weiße Tauben" (Morgenstern)

 Seven Silhouettes for piano, Op. 53 (1900)

 (Äußerst lebhaft) E minor
 (Ziemlich langsam) D major
 (Sehr bewegt und ausdrucksvoll) F-sharp major
 (Sehr schnell und anmutig) F-sharp minor
 (Ziemlich schnell) C major
 (Langsam, schwermütig) E major
 (Äußerst lebhaft und mit viel Humor) B major

 Fifteen songs, Op. 55 (1901)

 "Hymnus des Hasses" (Morgenstern)
 "Traum" (Evers)
 "Der tapfere Schneider" (Falke)
 "Rosen" (Itzerott)
 "Der Narr" (v. Jacobosky)
 "Verklärung" (Itzerott)
 "Sterne" (Ritter)
 "Zwei Gänze" (De Capitolio)
 "Ein Paar" (Braungart)
 "Wären wir zwei klein Vögel" (Greiner)
 "Viola d'amour" (Falke)
 "Nachtsegen" (Evars)
 "Gute Nacht" (Falke)
 "Allen Welten abgewandt" (Stona)
 "Der Alte" (Falke)

 Five organ preludes and fugues, Op. 56 (1901)

 E major
 D minor
 G major
 C major
 B minor

 Twelve organ pieces, Op. 59 (1901)

 Prelude
 Pastorale
 Intermezzo
 Kanon
 Toccata
 Fuge
 Kyrie
 Gloria
 Benedictus
 Capriccio
 Melodia
 Te Deum

 Organ Sonata No. 2, D minor, Op. 60 (1901)
 Improvisation
 Invocation
 Introduction and Fugue

 16 songs, Op. 62 (1901)

 "Wehe" (Boelitz)
 "Waldeseligkeit" (Dehmel)
 "Ruhe" (Evers)
 "Menschen und Natur" (Baumgart)
 "Wir zwei" (Falke)
 "Reinheit" (Boelitz)
 "Vor dem Sterben" (Boelitz)
 "Gebet" (Braungart)
 "Strampelchen" (Bluethgen)
 "Die Nixe" (Falke)
 "Fromm" (Falke)
 "Totensprache" (Jacobovsky)
 "Begegnung" (Mörike)
 "Ich schwebe" (Henkel)
 "Pflügerin Sorge" (Henkel)
 "Anmutiger Vertrag (Morgenstern)

 Monologues for organ, Op. 63 (1902)

 Prelude, C minor
 Fugue, C major
 Canzona, G minor
 Capriccio, A minor
 Intro, F minor
 Passacaglia, F minor
 Ave Maria
 Fantasy, C major
 Toccata, E minor
 Fugue, E minor
 Kanon, D major
 Scherzo, D minor

 Twelve songs, Op. 66 (1902)

 "Sehnsucht" (Itzerott)
 "Freundliche Vision" (Bierbaum)
 "Aus der ferne in der Nacht" (Bierbaum)
 "Du bist mir gut!" (Boelitz)
 "Maienblüten" (v. Jacobovsky)
 "Die Primeln" (Hamerling)
 "Die Liebe" (Dehmel)
 "An dich" (Itzerott)
 "Erlöst" (Itzerott)
 "Morgen" (Mackay)
 "Jetzt und immer" (Dehmel)
 "Kindergeschichte" (v. Jacobovsky)

 Six songs, Op. 68 (1902)

 "Eine Seele" (Jacobovsky)
 "Unterwgs" (Boelitz)
 "Märchenland" (Evers)
 "Engelwacht" (Muth)
 "Nachtseele" (Evers)
 "An die Geliebte" (Falke)

 Ten organ pieces, Op. 69 (1903)

 Prelude, E minor
 Fugue, E minor
 Basso ostinato, E minor
 Moment musical, D major
 Capriccio, D minor
 Toccata, D major
 Fugue, D major
 Romance, G minor
 Prelude, A minor
 Fugue, A minor

 Seventeen songs, Op. 70 (1903)

 "Präludium" (Boelitz)
 "Der König bei der Krönung" (Mörike)
 "Ritter rät dem Knappen dies" (Bierbaum)
 "Die bunten Kühe" (Falke)
 "Gruß" (Genischen)
 "Elternstolz" (folk song)
 "Meine Seele" (Evers)
 "Die Verschmäte" (Falke)
 "Sehnsucht" (Jacobovsky)
 "Hoffnungstrost" (from East Preussia)
 "Gegen Abend" (Bierbaum)
 "Dein Bild" (Jacobovsky)
 "Mein und dein" (Fischer)
 "Der Bote" (Fick)
 "Thränen" (Braungart)
 "Des Durstes Erklärung" (Fick)
 "Sommernacht" (Evers)

 18 songs, Op. 75 (1904)

 "Markspruch" (Weigand)
 "Mondnacht" (Evers)
 "Der Knabe an die Mutter" (Serbian)
 "Dämmer" (Boelitz)
 "Böses Weib" (16th century)
 "Ihr, ihr Herrlichen!" (Hölderlin)
 "Schlimm für die Männer" (Serbian)
 "Wäsche im Wind" (Falke)
 "All' mein Gedanken, mein Herz und mein Sinn" (Dahn)
 "Schwäbische Treue" (Seyboth)
 "Aeolsharfe" (Lingg)
 "Hat gesangt – bleibt nicht dabei" (folk song)
 "Das Ringlein" (Jacobovsky)
 "Schlafliedchen" (Busse)
 "Darum" (Seyboth)
 "Das Fenster klang im Winde!" (Evars)
 "Du brachtest mir deiner Seele Trank" (Braungart)
 "Einsamkeit" (Goethe)

 Simple songs, Op. 76 (1903–1912)

 "Du meines Herzens Krönelein"
 "Daz tuwer min Engel walte"
 "Waldeinsamkeit"
 "Wenn die Linde blüht"
 "Herzenstausch"
 "Beim Schneewetter"
 "Schlecht' Wetter"
 "Einen Brief soll ich schreiben"
 "Am Brünnelle"
 "Warte nur"
 "Mei Bua"
 "Mit Rosen bestreut"
 "Der verliebte Jäger"
 "Mein Schätzelein"
 "Maiennacht"
 "Glück"
 "Wenn alle Welt so einig wär"
 "In einem Rosengärtelein"
 "Hans und Grete"
 "Es blüht ein Blümlein"
 "Minnelied"
 "Des Kindes Gebet"
 "Zwiesprache"
 "Abgeguckt"
 "Friede"
 "Der Schwur"
 "Kindeslächeln"
 "Die Mutter spricht"
 "Schmeichelkätzchen"
 "Vorbeimarsch"
 "Gottes Segen"
 "Von der Liebe"
 "Das Wölklein"
 "Reiterlied"
 "Mittag"
 "Schelmenliedchen"
 "Heimat"
 "Das Mägdlein"
 "Abendlied"
 "Wunsch"
 "An den Frühlingsregen"
 "Der Postillon"
 "Brunnensang"
 "Klein Marie"
 "Lutschemäulchen"
 "Soldatenlied"
 "Schlaf' ein"
 "Zwei Mäuschen"
 "Ein Tänzchen"
 "Knecht Ruprecht"
 "Die fünf Hühnerchen"
 "Mariae Wiegenlied" (also arranged by the composer as a piano solo)
 "Das Brüderchen"
 "Das Schwesterchen"
 "Furchthäschen"
 "Der Igel"
 "Die Bienen"
 "Mäusefangen"
 "Zum Schlafen"
 "Der König aus dem Morgenland"

 Ten pieces for piano, Op. 79a (1900–1904)

 Humoreske
 Humoreske
 Intermezzo
 Melodie
 Romanze
 Impromptu
 Impromptu
 Caprice
 Capriccio
 Melodie

 Chorale preludes for organ, Op. 79b (1900–1904)

 Ach Gott, verlaß mich nicht
 Ein feste Burg ist unser Gott
 Herr, nun selbst den Wagen halt
 Morgenglanz der Ewigkeit
 
 Wer weiß, wie nahe mir mein Ende
 Auferstehn, ja auferstehn wirst du
 Christ ist erstanden von dem Tod
 Christus, der ist mein Leben
 
 Nun danket alle Gott
 Herr, nun selbst den Wagen halt
 Warum sollt ich mich denn grämen

 Eight songs, Op. 79c (1900–1904)

 "Abend" (Schäfer)
 "Um Mitternacht blühen die Blumen" (Stona)
 "Volkslied" (Itzerott)
 "Friede" (Huggenberger)
 "Auf mondbeschienen Wegen" (Huggenberger)
 "Die Glocke des Glücks" (Ritter)
 "Erinnerung" (Schäfer)
 "Züge" (Huggenberger)

 Suite for violin and piano', Op. 79d (1902–1904)
 Wiegenlied
 Capriccio
 Burla

 Two pieces for cello and piano, Op. 79e (1904)
 Caprice
 Kleine Romanze

 14 chorales for 4-, 5- or 6-part choir, Op. 79f (1900–1904)

 "Jesu, meines Lebens Leben" (4-part)
 "Auferstanden" (4-part)
 "Nun preiset alle" (4-part)
 "Nun preiset alle" (4-part)
 "Such, wer da will" (4-part)
 "Ach, Gott, verlaß mich nicht" (4-part)
 "Ich weiß, mein Gott" (4-part)
 "" (5-part)
 "Jesu, großer Wunderstern" (5-part)
 "Jesus soll die Losung sein" (5-part)
 "Trauungsgesang"
 "Auferstanden" (5-part)
 "Gib dich zufrieden" (5- or 6-part)

 Aus meinem Tagebuch, fünfunddreißig Stücke für Pianoforte, Op. 82 (1904–1912)

 Vol. 1, No. 1 Vivace
 Vol. 1, No. 2 Adagio
 Vol. 1, No. 3 Andante sostenuto
 Vol. 1, No. 4 Vivace
 Vol. 1, No. 5 "Gavotte" (Moderato)
 Vol. 1, No. 6 Sostenuto
 Vol. 1, No. 7 Vivace
 Vol. 1, No. 8 Andantino—Presto
 Vol. 1, No. 9 Vivace
 Vol. 1, No. 10 Andante innocente
 Vol. 1, No. 11 Sostenuto ed espressivo
 Vol. 1, No. 12 Larghetto
 Vol. 2, No. 1 Allegretto con grazia
 Vol. 2, No. 2 Andantino
 Vol. 2, No. 3 Andante espressivo
 Vol. 2, No. 4 Andantino
 Vol. 2, No. 5 Allegretto con grazia; sempre poco agitato
 Vol. 2, No. 6 Andante espressivo
 Vol. 2, No. 7 Larghetto
 Vol. 2, No. 8 Vivacissimo—Andante—Vivacissimo
 Vol. 2, No. 9 Andantino
 Vol. 2, No. 10 Scherzando e vivace
 Vol. 3, No. 1 "Lied" (Andante sostenuto)
 Vol. 3, No. 2 "Albumblatt" (Andante sostenuto)
 Vol. 3, No. 3 "Gavotte" (Allegretto)
 Vol. 3, No. 4 "Romanza" (Andante sostenuto)
 Vol. 3, No. 5 "Melodie" (Andante sostenuto)
 Vol. 3, No. 6 "Humoreske" (Vivace)
 Vol. 4, No. 1 "Präludium" (Poco con moto)
 Vol. 4, No. 2 "Fuge" (Sostenuto)
 Vol. 4, No. 3 "Intermezzo" (Andante)
 Vol. 4, No. 4 "Arabeske" (Allegretto)
 Vol. 4, No. 5 "Silhouette" (Con moto)
 Vol. 4, No. 6 "Melodie" (Molto sostenuto)
 Vol. 4, No. 7 "Humoreske" (Poco vivace)

 Four preludes and fugues for organ, Op. 85 (1905)
 C-sharp minor
 G major
 F major
 E minor

 Two compositions for violin and piano, Op. 87 (1905)
 Albumblatt
 Romanze

 Four songs, Op. 88 (1905)
 "Notturno" (Boelitz)
 "Stelldichein" (Hörmann)
 "Flötenspielerin" (Evers)
 "Spatz und Spätzin" (Meyere)

 Four sonatinas for piano, Op. 89 (1905–1908)
 E minor
 D major
 F major
 A minor

 Seven sonatas for violin solo, Op. 91 (1905)

 A minor
 D major
 B-flat major
 B minor
 E minor
 G major
 A minor

 Suite for organ No. 2, Op. 92 (1905)

 Prelude, G minor
 Fugue
 Intermezzo, B minor
 Basso ostinato, G minor
 Romance, A-flat major
 Toccata, G minor
 Fugue, G minor

 Four songs, Op. 97 (1906)
 "Das Dorf" (Boelitz)
 "Leise, leise weht ihr Lüfte" (Brentano)
 "Ein Drängen ist in meinem Herzen" (Stefan Zweig)
 "Der bescheidene Schäfer" (Weisse)

 Five songs, Op. 98 (1906)

 "Aus den Himmelsaugen" (Heine)
 "Der gute Rath" (Schatz)
 "Sonntag" (folk song)
 "Es schläft ein stiller Garten" (Hauptmann)
 "Sommernacht" (Triepel)

 Six songs, Op. 104 (1907)

 "Neue Fülle" (Zweig)
 "Warnung" (anon.)
 "Mutter, tote Mutter" (Hartwig)
 "Lied eines Mädchens" (13th century)
 "Das Sausewind" (Busse)
 "Mädchenlied" (Boelitz)

 Two sacred songs for mezzo / baritone and organ / harmonium / piano, Op. 105 (1907)
 "Ich sehe dich in tausend Bildern" (Novalis)
 "Meine Seele ist still zu Gott" (Psalm 62)

 Three duets for soprano, alto and piano, Op. 111a (1909)
 "Waldesstille" (Rafael)
 "Frühlingsfeier" (Steindorff)
 "Abendgang" (Brandtl)

 Episodes, eight pieces for piano, Op. 115 (1910)

 Andante, D major
 Andante con moto
 Allegretto, C major
 Andante sostenuto
 Larghetto
 Vivace
 Vivace quasi presto
 Vivace

 Eight preludes and fugues for solo violin, Op. 117 (1909–1912)

 B minor
 G minor
 E minor
 G minor (Chaconne)
 G major
 D minor
 A minor
 E minor

 Nine pieces for organ, Op. 129 (1913)

 Toccata, D minor
 Fugue, D minor
 Canon, E minor
 Melodia, B-flat major
 Capriccio, G minor
 Basso ostinato, G minor
 Intermezzo, F minor
 Prelude, B minor
 Fugue, B minor

 Six preludes and fugues for solo violin, Op. 131a (1914)

 A minor
 D minor
 G major
 G minor
 D major
 E minor

 Three suites for solo cello, Op. 131c (1915)
 G major
 D minor
 A minor

 Three suites for solo viola, Op. 131d (1915)
 G minor
 D major
 E minor

 Twelve sacred songs with piano / harmonium / organ accompaniment, Op. 137 (1914)

 "Bitte um einen seligen Tod" (Herman. gest. 1561)
 "Dein Wille, Herr, geschehe!" (Eichendorff)
 "Uns ist geboren ein Kindlein" (anon.)
 "Am Abend" (anon.)
 "O Herre Gott, nimm du von mir" (anon.)
 "Christ, deines Geistes Süßigkeit" (anon.)
 "Grablied" (Arndt)
 "Morgengesang" (Alberus)
 "Lass dich nur nichts nicht dauern" (Flemming)
 "Christkindleins Wiegenlied" (anon.)
 "Klage vor Gottes Leiden" (v)
 "O Jesu Christ, wir warten dein" (Alberus)

 5 Neue Kinderlieder, Op. 142 (1915)

 "Wiegenlied" (Stein)
 "Schwalbenmütterlein"(Reinick)
 "Maria am Rosenstrauch" (Schellenberg)
 "Klein-Evelinde" (Weber)
 "Bitte" (Holst)

 Träume am Kamin, 12 Kleine Klavierstücke, Op. 143 (1915)

 Larghetto, B-flat major
 Con moto, E-flat major
 Molto adagio, A major
 Allegretto grazioso, E major
 Agitato, B minor
 Poco vivace, A-flat major
 Molto sostenuto, D major
 Vivace, C major
 Larghetto, C minor
 Vivace, D minor
 Andantino, G minor
 Larghetto, D major

Details of sets of compositions with WoO number 

 "Grüße an die Jugend" for piano (1898) WoO III/6

 Fughette
 Caprice fantastique
 Abenddämmerung
 Albumblatt
 Scherzo
 Humoresque

 Blätter und Blüten for piano (1900/1902)  WoO III/12

 Albumblatt
 Humoresque
 Frühlingslied
 Elegie
 Jagdstück
 Melodie
 Moment Musical No. 1
 Moment Musical No. 2
 Gigue
 Romanze No. 1
 Romanze No. 2
 Scherzino

 Four "Spezialstudien" for piano left hand (1901) WoO III/13
 Scherzo
 Humoresque
 Romanze
 Prelude and Fugue

 Fünf ausgewählte Volkslieder für TTBB (1898) WoO VI/6
 Herzweh (1817, Gotha, with an additional second stanza by Hermann Kurz)
 Liebchens Bote (Flugblatt 1756)
 Das Sternlein (Matthias Claudius)
 Dianderl tief drunt im Thal (from Carinthia)
 Ich hab' die Nacht geträumet

 Sechs ausgewählte Volkslieder für SATB (1899) WoO VI/10
 Liebesschmerz (from Swabia)
 Das Sternlein (Matthias Claudius)
 Liebesqual (from Swabia)
 Vergebens (from Franconia)
 Liebchens Bote (Flugblatt 1756)
 Das Mädchen vom Lande (Johann Wilhelm Ludwig Gleim)

 Acht ausgewählte Volkslieder. Neue Folge, für SATB (1899) WoO VI/11
 Mailied (Friedrich Richter)
 Ach, Bäumchen, du stehst grüne (überliefert by Karl Simrock
 Liebesleid
 Ich hab' die Nacht geträumet
 Trutze nicht (from the Odenwald 1839)
 Wie kommt's? (from Thuringia and Franconia)
 Schwäbisches Tanzliedchen (Ländler from Upper Swabia)
 Es waren zwei Königskinder

Notes

References

Bibliography 

 

 

Lists of compositions by composer